Artisan Entertainment (formerly known as U.S.A. Home Video, International Video Entertainment (IVE) and LIVE Entertainment) was an American film studio and home video company. It was considered one of the largest mini-major film studios until it was purchased by later mini-major film studio Lions Gate Entertainment in 2003. At the time of its acquisition, Artisan had a library of thousands of films developed through acquisition, original production, and production and distribution agreements. Its headquarters and private screening room were located in Santa Monica, California. It also had an office in Tribeca in Manhattan, New York.

The company owned the home video rights to the film libraries of Republic Pictures, ITC Entertainment, EMI Films, Gladden Entertainment, Miramax Films, Hemdale Film Corporation, The Shooting Gallery, and Carolco Pictures before it went defunct.

Artisan's releases included Requiem for a Dream, Pi, Killing Zoe, The Blair Witch Project, Grizzly Falls, Startup.com, Novocaine, and National Lampoon's Van Wilder.

History
Artisan, unlike most movie studios, had its roots in the home video industry.

1980s
Artisan Entertainment was formed in 1981 by Noel C. Bloom as Family Home Entertainment, Inc., and it was initially operated as a subsidiary of adult film distributor Caballero Control Corporation. It received a distribution pact with Wizard Video. In 1982, the latter had sold The Texas Chainsaw Massacre 10,000 copies a week. Also that year, the label started distributing titles by Monterey Home Video. Later on, it received a distribution deal with MGM/UA Home Video to distribute the library. In 1983, it received a new agreement with Filmation in order to distribute the library on videocassette.

In 1983, FHE began operating its new subsidiary U.S.A. Home Video, when tapes were usually packaged in large boxes and included non-family films such as Supergirl, Silent Night, Deadly Night, several Lorimar titles and many B-movies, including those that begin and end with B-actress Sybil Danning talking about the film that is being shown under the Adventure Video label. U.S.A. also released sports videos under the U.S.A. Sports Video label.

In 1984, FHE and U.S.A. became part of Noel Bloom's NCB Entertainment Group (which also included Bloom's other labels Caballero Home Video, Monterey Home Video and Thriller Video), and then later on that year, both were consolidated into International Video Entertainment, Inc., formed under NCB and also taking ownership of Monterey and Thriller Video. The IVE name was used for non-family releases (although the U.S.A. name continued until 1987) and the FHE name was used for family releases Also that year, Bloom launched Concept Productions to develop live programming. In the late 1980s, the company also branched out into film distribution for television.

In 1987, IVE was acquired by Carolco Pictures from NCB Entertainment after Carolco had taken a minority interest in the latter a year earlier. The unrated release of Angel Heart was the first Carolco film released by IVE on video. The studio hired Jose Menendez, previously of RCA, as head of IVE; he was responsible for creating product deals with Sylvester Stallone's White Eagle Enterprises and producer Edward Pressman. In 1989, Menendez and his wife were murdered by their two sons. Also in 1987, Noel C. Bloom left IVE, following disputes with Carolco, to start out Celebrity Home Entertainment, with some of IVE's employees defecting to Celebrity. Later that year, the company had acquired the assets of home video distributor Vista Home Video from The Vista Organization for $38 million.

In 1988, IVE and FHE consolidated into LIVE Entertainment after a merger with wholesale media distributor Lieberman Enterprises. LIVE formed new ventures outside the home video business, including an ownership of retail music and video chains across the East Coast, after the acquisitions of such stores as Strawberries and Waxie Maxie and its Lieberman subsidiary acquired Navarre Corporation. Also that year, it partnered with distributor Radio Vision International to launch a music-oriented label, Radio Vision Video.

1990–1997
In 1990, IVE became LIVE Home Video. Carolco formed its own home video division under partnership with LIVE. The company also formed Avid Home Entertainment, which reissued older IVE products, as well as ITC Entertainment's back catalogue, on videocassette at discount prices. Also in 1990, LIVE acquired German video distributor VCL.

LIVE Entertainment also branched out into film production. The company spent more than a million dollars to finance the 1992 film Reservoir Dogs, which marked the directorial debut of Quentin Tarantino. Other films included Paul Schrader's Light Sleeper.

On January 11, 1991, Live announced that it would acquire Vestron, Inc. for $24 million after its downfall; Vestron had been known best for Dirty Dancing, which had been the second highest-grossing independent film of all time. Vestron releases continued into 1992. For several years starting in 1993, LIVE Entertainment distributed anime released by Pioneer Entertainment, including Tenchi Muyo! Ryo-Ohki and the first Tenchi Muyo! movie, Tenchi Muyo! in Love.

Much of LIVE's earnings were partially thanks to Carolco's investment in the company, but by 1991, the studio was in such debt that a plan to merge the two companies was called off that December; around this time, the Lieberman assets were sold to another video distributor, Handleman, in an effort to stem LIVE's financial bleeding. In 1993, Carolco restructured itself and was forced to sell its shares in LIVE Entertainment to a group of investors led by Pioneer Electronic Corporation. In August 1994, Carolco and LIVE plotted another merger attempt, but the plans fell apart once again that October. Under new CEO Roger Burlage, the unprofitable retail assets were sold and more focus was placed upon film production. In 1996, when Carolco ceased to exist as a company, StudioCanal got full rights to their film library; LIVE, under a new deal with the French-based production company, continued to distribute Carolco's films for video.

1997–2003
In 1997, LIVE was acquired by Bain Capital and was taken private. Though Burlage was retained as chairman initially, a new trio of executives took power: former International Creative Management agent Bill Block and former October Films partner Amir Malin became co-presidents, while former Bain Capital financial consultant Mark Curcio handled financial matters. Their goal was to utilize the large video library and the consistent profit from that area to invest in independent film production, which they saw as a market in flux in the wake of several notable independent film companies, including Orion Pictures, Miramax Films and others being subsumed into larger corporate organizations. 

On December 18, 1997, LIVE entered into a domestic home video deal with Hallmark Entertainment to handle the distribution of products from their Hallmark Home Entertainment subsidiary, including Crayola-branded releases and Hallmark Hall of Fame movies. These releases would be distributed under Family Home Entertainment, while Hallmark Home Entertainment would retain marketing rights. By 1998, products from Cabin Fever Entertainment were added to the deal after Hallmark purchased and folded the company in March of that year.

As part of a restructuring process, in April 1998, LIVE Entertainment was rebranded as Artisan Entertainment; the rebranding was in part motivated by LIVE's reputation for mediocre product and lingering memories of their connection to the Menendez brothers case.

In addition to adding more theatrical releases, the company's home video subsidiary, Artisan Home Entertainment. continued to expand with more home video deals. The company began releasing products from TSG Pictures around this time, and by September 1998, Artisan signed a deal with Spelling Entertainment Group to distribute films from its Republic Pictures unit for home video release throughout a five-ten year period.This was followed in October 1999 with a four-year home video deal with Discovery Communications to release programming from the Discovery Channel, Animal Planet and TLC networks through dedicated labels under Family Home Entertainment.

On February 10, 2000, Artisan acquired a minority stake in The Baby Einstein Company in exchange for a three-year North American home video distribution agreement for the Baby Einstein catalog.The deal was eventually revoked early at the end of 2001 following The Walt Disney Company's purchase of The Baby Einstein Company.

In May 2000, Marvel Studios negotiated a deal with Artisan Entertainment for a co-production joint venture that included rights to 15 Marvel characters including Captain America, Thor, the Black Panther, Iron Fist, and Deadpool. Artisan would finance and distribute while Marvel would developing licensing and merchandising tie-ins. The resulting production library, which would also include TV series, direct-to-video films and internet projects, would be co-owned.

On September 13, 2000, Artisan launched Artisan Digital Media and iArtisan.

In 2001, the company acquired Canadian film and TV company Landscape Entertainment.

In May 2003, Artisan and Microsoft jointly announced the first release of a high definition DVD, Terminator 2: Judgment Day (Extreme Edition). The release was a promotion for the Windows Media version 9 format; it could only be played on a personal computer with Windows XP. Artisan had released the movie in 2002 on D-VHS. 

In the summer of 2003, Marvel Enterprises placed an offer for Artisan, with then-Disney-owned and Weinstein-operated Miramax Films to provide backing for Marvel's bid. On December 15, 2003, Lions Gate Entertainment Corporation acquired Artisan for $220 million and video releases through Artisan have now been re-released under the Lionsgate Home Entertainment banner. After the sale, Artisan Entertainment, Inc. was renamed to Lions Gate Entertainment, Inc.

Filmography

As LIVE Entertainment

As Artisan Entertainment

Television films

References

Film production companies of the United States
Home video companies of the United States
Entertainment companies based in New York City
Entertainment companies established in 1981
Entertainment companies disestablished in 2004
Defunct companies based in New York City
Former Lionsgate subsidiaries
American film studios
Home video distributors
2003 mergers and acquisitions